Ravensthorpe may refer to any of the following places.

England
Ravensthorpe, Dewsbury in West Yorkshire
Ravensthorpe railway station, Dewsbury
Ravensthorpe, Northamptonshire
Ravensthorpe, Peterborough in Cambridgeshire
Ravensthorpe, an historic manor in the parish of Boltby, North Yorkshire

Australia
Ravensthorpe, Western Australia
Shire of Ravensthorpe
Ravensthorpe Airport
Ravensthorpe Nickel Mine